This is a list of all the recorded matches played by the Wallis and Futuna soccer team, which represents Wallis and Futuna in international men's football. The team is controlled by the governing body for football in Wallis and Futuna, the Wallis and Futuna Soccer Federation.

The federation is not a member of the world governing body FIFA or Oceania Football Confederation, they are currently ineligible for global competitions such as the FIFA World Cup and OFC Nations Cup. As such, they do not have an official FIFA ranking.

Key

Key to matches
Att.=Match attendance
(H)=Home ground
(A)=Away ground
(N)=Neutral ground

Results

Head-to-head record

Up to matches played on 20 August 1995.

References

National association football team results